Hasina is a female Arabic given name meaning chaste, virtuous. It is also used as a surname. It may refer to:

Female people
Sheikh Hasina, incumbent Prime Minister of Bangladesh
Hasina Murshed, Bengali politician
Hasina Miya, Nepalese politician

Male people
Ny Hasina Andriamanjato, Malagasy politician

Other
 Hasina (film)
 Hasina, the concepts of personal sanctity, sanctification and imbued authority in the traditional cultures of Madagascar